Jörg Bode (born 22 August 1969 in Melle, West Germany) is a German football coach and a former player.

References

External links
 

1969 births
Living people
People from Melle, Germany
Footballers from Lower Saxony
German football managers
German footballers
Germany under-21 international footballers
Association football midfielders
Bundesliga players
2. Bundesliga players
Arminia Bielefeld players
Hamburger SV players
Hamburger SV II players
FC Augsburg players
SC Verl players